Catoptria xerxes is a moth in the family Crambidae. It was described by Sauber in 1904. It is found in China (Xinjiang).

References

Crambini
Moths described in 1904
Moths of Asia